The Indian locomotive class WCM-4 is a class of 1.5 kV DC electric locomotives that was developed in 1956 by Vulcan Foundry and English Electric for Indian Railways. The model name stands for broad gauge (W), Direct Current (C), Mixed traffic (M) engine, 4th generation (4). They entered service in 1961. A total of 7 WCM-4 locomotives was built at England between 1956 and 1957.

History
Indian Railways decided to procure 7 locomotives from Hitachi. They are manufactured in Japan and shipped to India in 1957. These locomotives had now common Co-Co wheel arrangement.  Initially the WCM-4 class were known as EM/4 class.

See also

Rail transport in India#History
Indian Railways
Locomotives of India
Rail transport in India

References

External links

http://www.irfca.org/faq/faq-specs.html#WCM-4

India railway fan club

Electric locomotives of India
1500 V DC locomotives
Co-Co locomotives
Railway locomotives introduced in 1961
5 ft 6 in gauge locomotives
English Electric locomotives
Vulcan Foundry locomotives